Philip Michael Tuts is an American high-energy experimental particle physicist, and Professor and Chair of the Columbia University Physics Department. Tuts is a Fellow of the American Physical Society. He holds a seat on the executive committees of the United States LHC Users' Association and the American Physics Society Forum on Physics and Society, and is Divisional Councilor of the Division of Particles and Fields of APS. Tuts earned his Bachelor's in Physics from MIT in 1974, and his MA and PhD from the State University of New York at Stony Brook in 1976 and 1979, respectively. Tuts joined the physics department at Columbia in 1983 and was appointed Chair in 2014. Tuts is currently a member of the ATLAS experiment team at CERN and formerly served as US ATLAS Operations Program Manager.

As operations manager, he led the team of 400 American physicists working on ATLAS during the experiment that led to the discovery of the Higgs boson. Tuts is project manager of the D0 experiment at Fermilab and also leads the Calorimeter subgroup.

Tuts has also used the CUSB detector at the Cornell Electron Storage Ring to investigate the Upsilon meson. Tuts has authored over 600 publications in Physics. He believes in the importance of public outreach by prominent physicists and the science community, and writes a blog for the Huffington Post. Professor Tuts has also given talks about his work at amateur societies and for lay audiences, and organized a gathering to watch the Higgs Boson announcement at Columbia University at 3 a.m. ET (9a.m. Geneva time). At Columbia, he teaches introductory undergraduate mechanics and electromagnetics courses, which he enjoys. In 2004, Tuts was awarded a Presidential Award for Outstanding Teaching. He has stated that he has been mistaken for Stephen King on several occasions.

Selected publications 
"Observation of the ´´´ at the Cornell Electron Storage Ring", with CUSB Collaboration, Phys. Rev. Lett. 45, 222 (1980).
"Observation of P-Wave  Bound States", with CUSB Collaboration, Phys. Rev. Lett. 49, 1612 (1984)
"Measurement of the Upsilon Mass", with W. W. Mackay et al. and the CUSB collaboration, Phys. Rev. Lett. 55, 36 (1985).
"CUSB-II a high precision electromagnetic spectrometer", with CUSB Collaboration, Nucl. Instrum. Methods AA309, 450 (1991)
"Observation of the Top Quark, with the D0 Collaboration", Phys. Rev. Lett.. 74, 2632 (1995)
"Limits on the ZZg and Zgg couplings in pbarp Collisions at S1/2 = 1.8 TeV", with the D0 Collaboration, Phys. Rev. Lett. 75, 1028 (1995)
"Search for Large Extra Dimensions in Dielectron and Diphoton production", Phys. Rev. Lett. {86} 1156 (2001)
"Search for Leptoquark Pairs Decaying to nunu+Jets in pbarp Collisions at sqrt(s)=1.8 TeV", Phys. Rev. Lett. {88}, 191801 (2002)

References

External links 
Complete bibliography
Discovering the Unexpected by Professor Tuts
Michael Tuts on Scientific American's "Ask the Experts"
Scientific publications of Michael Tuts on INSPIRE-HEP

Year of birth missing (living people)
Living people
Columbia University faculty
21st-century American physicists
People associated with CERN
Particle physicists
Stony Brook University alumni
Place of birth missing (living people)
MIT Department of Physics alumni
Fellows of the American Physical Society